A Valediction is the sixth studio album by the German technical death metal band Obscura. It was released by the music label Nuclear Blast on 19 November 2021.

Background
The album was written and recorded separately by the band members during the COVID-19 pandemic. The recordings were then sent to Studio Fredman in Gothenburg, Sweden. The vocals and acoustic guitar parts were recorded there and the final album was mixed and mastered by Fredrik Nordström. 

Music videos were released for the tracks "Solaris", "A Valediction", "Devoured Usurper", "When Stars Collide", "The Neuromancer" and "Heritage".

Reception

Kevin Stewart-Panko of Metal Injection wrote "As far as technical death metal goes, A Valediction will receive deserved glowing praise from fans and heaps of critical brown nosing from those in the know." Sean Mclennan of New Noise stated the album "contains a collection of the band's most vibrant and emotive material heard on record."

Track listing

Personnel
Obscura
 Steffen Kummerer – guitar, vocals
 Christian Münzner – guitar
 Jeroen Paul Thesseling – bass
 David Diepold – drums

Additional personnel
 Fredrik Nordström – producer, mixing, mastering
 Mathias Garmusch, Robert Kukla, Yuma van Eekelen – additional engineering
 Björn Strid – vocals 
 Eliran Kantor – artwork
 Vincent Grundke – photography

Charts

References 

2021 albums
Nuclear Blast albums
Obscura (band) albums